is a Japanese football player.

Playing career
Known by the nickname 'Jumbo' due to his size he plays primarily as a target man striker, getting the majority of his goals with his head. Popular with fans and teammates during his career due to his entertaining personality he hosted a radio show while at his previous club Avispa Fukuoka.

On 15 March 2019, Okubo joined Yokohama Fifty Club.

Club statistics
Updated to 23 February 2021.

References

External links

1980 births
Living people
Komazawa University alumni
Association football people from Kanagawa Prefecture
Japanese footballers
J1 League players
J2 League players
J3 League players
Japan Football League players
Yokohama FC players
Sagawa Shiga FC players
Kashiwa Reysol players
Avispa Fukuoka players
Montedio Yamagata players
Tochigi SC players
Thespakusatsu Gunma players
Association football forwards